S Tamoio (S-31)  was the second  of the Brazilian Navy.

Construction and career
The boat was built at Arsenal de Marinha do Rio de Janeiro in Rio de Janeiro and was launched on 18 November 1993 and commissioned on 17 July 1995.

Gallery

References

External links

Ships built in Brazil
Tupi-class submarines
1993 ships